On the Way to the Airport is a South Korean television series starring Kim Ha-neul, Lee Sang-yoon, Shin Sung-rok, Choi Yeo-jin, and Jang Hee-jin, about married individuals who meet by fate and become more involved in each other's lives. It aired from September 21 to November 10, 2016 on KBS2's Wednesdays and Thursdays at 22:00 KST time slot for 16 episodes.

Synopsis
Choi Soo-ah (Kim Ha-neul) is an experienced AirAsia stewardess who is married to Park Jin-seok (Shin Sung-rok), a pilot who dominates every aspect of her and their daughter Park Hyo-eun's (Kim Hwan-hee) life. Despite the protest, Jin-seok sends Hyo-eun to an international school in Malaysia where she meets Annie Seo/Seo Eun-woo, Seo Do-woo's (Lee Sang-yoon) daughter. Tragedy strikes when Annie dies while in an attempt to come back home and despite their denial, Soo-ah and Do-woo's lives get intertwined together.

Cast

Main
Kim Ha-neul as Choi Soo-ah, a twelve-year veteran flight attendant.
Lee Sang-yoon as Seo Do-woo, a part-time university lecturer in architecture.
Shin Sung-rok as Park Jin-seok, a pilot and Soo-ah's husband.
Choi Yeo-jin as Song Mi-jin.
Jang Hee-jin as Kim Hye-won, Do-woo's wife.

Supporting

Soo-ah's family
Kim Hwan-hee as Park Hyo-eun, Soo-ah and Jin-seok's daughter.
Kim Kwon as Choi Je-ah.
Lee Young-ran as Kim Young-sook.

Do-woo's family
Ye Soo-jung as Go Eun-hee.
Park Seo-yeon as Annie Seo / Seo Eun-woo.
Son Jong-hak as Min-seok.

People around Soo-ah
Oh Ji-hye as Mary.
Seo Cho-won as Supporting.
Ha Jae-sook as Lee Hyeon-joo.

People around Do-woo
Choi Song-hyun as Han Ji-eun.
Park Gyeong-ree as Kim-yeong
Jay Kim as Jang Hyun-woo.
Jo Kyung-sook as Hong Kyung-ja.
Kim Sa-hee as Hwang Hyun-jeong.
Song Yoo-hyun as Choi Kyung-sook.

Airline staff
Jung Yeon-joo as Kang Eun-joo.
Lee Jung-hyuk as Park Sang-hyeop.
Kim Sung-hoon as Park Chang-hoon.
Kim Tae-hyung as Kevin Oh.
Park Seon-im as Kim Joo-hyun.
Na Hye-jin as Yang Hye-jin.
Choi Seo-yeon as Lee Seon-young.

Others
Park Min-jung as Ms. Kim

Original soundtrack

Part 1

Part 2

Part 3

Part 4

Part 5

Ratings

Awards and nominations

Notes

References

External links
  
 
 
 
 

Korean-language television shows
Korean Broadcasting System television dramas
2016 South Korean television series debuts
2016 South Korean television series endings
Television series by Studio Dragon
Adultery in television
South Korean romance television series
South Korean melodrama television series
Aviation television series